Jolie Lindholm is a singer from Florida, best known for providing backing vocals on numerous Dashboard Confessional albums, as well as the lead vocalist in the indie rock band The Rocking Horse Winner. She later sang in Popvert. She currently serves as frontwoman for the post-hardcore band The Darling Fire and works for a south Florida real estate agency. In 2011, Lindholm married former The Rocking Horse Winner bandmate (and future The Darling Fire bandmate) Jeronimo Gomez.

Bands
 The Rocking Horse Winner: Vocals (1999–2003)
 Popvert: Vocals (2005–2006)
 The Darling Fire: Vocals (2019–present)

References

External links 
 
 
 
 

1976 births
Living people
Musicians from Florida
The Rocking Horse Winner members